The 1985 Borobudur bombing occurred on 21 January 1985 when nine bombs detonated at the Borobudur Buddhist temple located in Magelang, Central Java, Indonesia. There were no human casualties in this attack; however, nine stupas on the upper rounded terraces of Arupadhatu were badly damaged by bombs.

Perpetrator
In 1991, a blind Muslim preacher, Husein Ali Al Habsyi, was sentenced to life imprisonment for masterminding a series of bombings in the mid-1980s including this temple attack. It is believed that the attack was in retaliation from the Tanjung Priok massacre in 1984. During trial, Habsyi refused to be held responsible for the attack and mentioned Mohammad Jawad, a mysterious figure, as the true mastermind. The identity of Mohammad Jawad remains unknown. On 23 March 1999 Habsyi was pardoned and released by Indonesian President B. J. Habibie's administration. Two other members of a right-wing extremist group that carried out the bombings were each sentenced to 20 years in 1986 and another man received a 13-year prison term.

See also
 List of Islamist terrorist attacks

References

Terrorist incidents in Indonesia
1985 crimes in Indonesia
Borobudur
History of Java
Attacks on religious buildings and structures in Asia
Persecution of Buddhists
January 1985 events in Asia
Islamic terrorism in Indonesia
Terrorist incidents in Indonesia in 1985